Vampire Secrets is a 2006 docudrama about the mythology and lifestyle of vampires, produced by Indigo Films for the History Channel, and narrated by Corey Burton.

The documentary features the history of vampires from Indian (Hindu goddess Kali), Greek, and Chinese origins, and references to the Bible and ancient Mesopotamia. Other topics include:

 Bram Stoker's 1897 novel, Dracula
 James Spalding, a Scotsman, 1632
 Elizabeth Báthory
 Haidamaque, Hungary, 1715
 Blood ritual
 Anne Rice's vampire novels
 Vampire: The Masquerade: Rod Ferrell (VTM role-player from Murray, Kentucky who thought he was a real vampire), killed two people in Eustis, Florida, USA, and was sentenced to death (but reduced to life imprisonment)
 Sex appeal: Nosferatu (1922 film), 1931 film with Béla Lugosi (The Master of Horror), Vampirella, Demonlover; and others.
 Vampire underground and gothic subculture: Susan Walsh (researcher for The Village Voice) who falls for a purported "living vampire" (Christian) and disappears in January 1996
 Psychic vampire (Rasputin, aura photography, Joe H. Slate), Sanguine, vampire lifestylers

The documentary also features commentaries by authors Katherine Ramsland, and J. Gordon Melton, parapsychologist Loyd Auerbach, psychic vampire author and spokesperson Michelle Belanger, Father Sebastiaan, forensic biologist Mark Benecke, professor Thomas Garza, and others.

Cast
Deborah Rombaut as Demon Woman
Adrian Balbontin as Gaspard Robilette
Lyndsey Nelson as Susan Walsh
Scott Updegrave as Richard Wendorf
Christa Bella as Elizabeth Bathory
Jack Sale as Rod Ferrell
Thais Harris as Katherine Ramsland
Dan Higgins as James Spalding
George Mauro as Bram Stoker
Kari Wishingrad as Bathory Chambermaid
Jeffery Davis as Vampire
Justin Rodgers Hall as Vampire
Peter Stack as Ficzk

Notes and references

External links 
 
 

2006 documentary films
2006 television films
2006 films
American documentary television films
History (American TV channel) original programming
American vampire films
Documentary films about the paranormal
Cultural depictions of Elizabeth Báthory
American docudrama films
2000s English-language films
2000s American films